Ole Christian Eidhammer (born April 15, 1965, in Trondheim) is a Norwegian former ski jumper who competed from 1983 to 1990. His best-known success was at the 1988 Winter Olympics, where he earned a bronze medal in the team large hill event. Eidhammer also won a silver medal in the team large hill at the 1987 FIS Nordic World Ski Championships. He also participated in the 1984 Winter Olympics in Sarajevo with 18th place in the large hill.

External links
 
 

1965 births
Living people
Norwegian male ski jumpers
Olympic ski jumpers of Norway
Olympic bronze medalists for Norway
Ski jumpers at the 1984 Winter Olympics
Ski jumpers at the 1988 Winter Olympics
Olympic medalists in ski jumping
FIS Nordic World Ski Championships medalists in ski jumping
Medalists at the 1988 Winter Olympics
Sportspeople from Trondheim
20th-century Norwegian people